The MV Regal Lady is a 1930 built steel passenger boat moored at the port of Scarborough, North Yorkshire. She is a National Historic Ship, owned and preserved by Scarborough Pleasure Steamers. The ship participated in Operation Dynamo at Dunkirk, was decommissioned in 1946, and in 1954 was moved to Scarborough and renamed from Oulton Belle to its current name.

Mechanics
Powered by a Gardner Marine 8L3B long stroke reciprocal diesel engine, has a cruising speed of nine knots. One of very few vessels to use a twin rudder system, she steered from her bow whilst going astern using a fore rudder, and conventionally steers from a large stern rudder when steaming ahead. Her steering gear is operated by chains and spliced wire driving the two large cast iron quadrants from her opposing geared ships wheel, an original feature of the vessel.

In 1948 her bow propeller was removed, the old funnel replaced and an upper deck added.

History
Launched on 23 May 1930 at Fellows and Co, Great Yarmouth by Lady Fellow. She was built to a proven design, unique to the Oulton Broad, featuring a canoe hull, and known as a 'double-ender', complementing her identical bows and stern. Underneath the waterline, Regal Lady was originally propelled by two four bladed cast iron props, one fore and one aft, the main reason being that she was too large to turn round on the Norfolk waterways. Powered by a steam engine with direct drive to either shaft.

Naval service
In 1940 Regal Lady and her crew were requisitioned by the Admiralty, and participated in Operation Dynamo. It is known that in three crossings, she carried 1200 troops over the channel, back to Ramsgate. After the epic of Dunkirk, Regal Lady relocated to the River Clyde in Scotland, where she continued to serve in the war as a tender to the great liners, Queen Mary and Queen Elizabeth, transporting American Troops. In 1945, she was released back to her original owners based in Great Yarmouth.

Passenger service
The name Regal Lady came about in 1954 when she initially moved to Scarborough. A tradition dating back to the early 20th Century, she is the sixth and last vessel in Scarborough to bear the name 'Lady'.

In 1962 the Lady was fitted with radar, and passengers allowed to look through it for a shilling.

She returned to Norwich in 1970 and operated cruises from near Foundry Bridge until 1984. Tom Machin (North Sea Leisure) brought her back to Scarborough on 8 January 1987. Her wheelhouse was replaced in glass fibre and her steel superstructure extended, ready for her first public trip on 24 May 1987. In February 2020 she was converted into a Dunkirk museum, moored at Vincent Pier.

References

External links 
Photos

History of Dunkirk
Museum ships in the United Kingdom
Passenger ships of England
Scarborough, North Yorkshire
1930 ships